Tanda is a constituency of the Uttar Pradesh Legislative Assembly covering the town of Tanda in the Ambedkar Nagar district of Uttar Pradesh, India. It is one of five assembly constituencies in the Ambedkar Nagar Lok Sabha constituency. Since 2008, this assembly constituency is numbered 278 amongst 403 constituencies.

As of March 2022, this seat belongs to Samajwadi Party candidate Ram Murti Verma who won in last Assembly election of 2022 Uttar Pradesh Legislative Elections defeating BJP candidate Kapil Deo Verma by a margin of 31,491 votes.

Election results

2022

2017

Members of the Legislative Assembly
Previous MLAs from Tanda Assembly constituency

TANDA Constituency Results from 1977 to 2022

References

External links
 

Assembly constituencies of Uttar Pradesh
Ambedkar Nagar district